GRF  greystone reaction force 
 Gaussian random field
 Gerald R. Ford, 38th president of the United States
 Global Relief Foundation
 Grifols, a European pharmaceutical company
 Ground reaction force
 Gonadotropin-releasing hormone
 Growth hormone-releasing factor
 Gray Army Airfield, in Washington, United States
 Groupement des Radiodiffuseurs Français de l’UER, a French public radio and television broadcasting organisation
 Gold Refining Forum forum for professional and amateur refiners.